Ferenc Somogyi (1 September 1945 in Hartkirchen, Austria – 30 March 2021) was a Hungarian ambassador to the United States.

Career

A former businessman, he is a member of the Hungarian Socialist Party and served as foreign minister from November 1, 2004 until a cabinet shuffle in June 2006. His appointment to that position was announced in September 2004. Previously, he was the deputy ambassador to the United Nations during the 1980s in Hungary's communist government, and was a telephone company executive during the 1990s.  In late 2007, Somogyi was appointed Hungarian Ambassador to the United States.

Private life
Father of three children.

References

External links

The Washington Diplomat Newspaper - Ambassador profile
Embassy of Hungary in the USA: The Ambassador
Embassy of Hungary in the USA: Biography of the Ambassador

1945 births
2021 deaths
People from Eferding District
Foreign ministers of Hungary
Ambassadors of Hungary to the United States
Hungary–United States relations